Kampmann's  first cabinet was the government of Denmark from 21 February to 18 November 1960, headed by Viggo Kampmann as prime minister. It was a coalition between the Social Democrats, the Danish Social Liberal Party and the Justice Party, which continued from the previous government led by H. C. Hansen who had died two days prior. It was called "the triangle cabinet" because of its composition of three political parties.

Composition

|}

References

 Cabinets of Denmark
 1960 establishments in Denmark
 Cabinets established in 1960
 Cabinets disestablished in 1960